Hans Schweitzer (25 July 1901 – 15 September 1980), known as Mjölnir, or Mjoelnir was an artist who produced many posters for the Nazi Party (NSDAP) under Adolf Hitler.  In Teutonic mythology, Mjölnir is the name of Thor's hammer.

He was recruited to produce Nazi propaganda posters by Joseph Goebbels.  The posters depicted crude but memorable caricatures of the NSDAP's opponents.  A recurring image was of a Sturmabteilung (SA) member side by side with a Heer soldier. Schweitzer was named a professor in 1937, and was named "Reich Commissioner for Artistic Design" and chairman of the Reich Committee of Press Illustrators.

After the war, Schweitzer remained in the western occupation zone. In the course of denazification, Schweitzer was fined 500 Deutschemarks in Hamburg-Bergedorf. He was boycotted as "Goebbels' illustrator", but nonetheless found work designing posters for West German federal press and information office and as an illustrator in the far-right press. In East Germany, some of his earlier work was discarded from library collections.

References

External link

German graphic designers
German poster artists
Nazi propaganda
Nazi propagandists
1980 deaths
1901 births